A total solar eclipse will occur on December 15, 2039. A solar eclipse occurs when the Moon passes between Earth and the Sun, thereby totally or partly obscuring the image of the Sun for a viewer on Earth. A total solar eclipse occurs when the Moon's apparent diameter is larger than the Sun's, blocking all direct sunlight, turning day into darkness. Totality occurs in a narrow path across Earth's surface, with the partial solar eclipse visible over a surrounding region thousands of kilometres wide.

The totality of the eclipse begins in the southern Pacific Ocean, passing over much of Antarctica and closely reaching the South Pole. A partial eclipse will be visible in the southern extremities of South America and Africa. It will terminate in the southern Indian Ocean several hours later.

Images
Animated path

Related eclipses

Solar eclipses of 2036–2039

Saros 152

Metonic cycle

References

External links
 NASA graphics

2039 in science
2039 12 15
2039 12 15